Boy River Township is a township in Cass County, Minnesota, United States. The population was 100 as of the 2000 census. This township took its name from the Boy River.

Geography

The city of Boy River is located entirely within Boy River Township geographically but is a separate entity.

Lakes
 Skelly Lake (northeast half)

Adjacent townships
 Salem Township (east)
 Slater Township (southeast)
 Rogers Township (south)
 Boy Lake Township (southwest)
 Gould Township (west)

Cemeteries
The township contains Arlington Cemetery.

Demographics
As of the census of 2000, there were 100 people, 36 households, and 23 families residing in the township. The population density was 2.8 people per square mile (1.1/km2). There were 45 housing units at an average density of 1.3/sq mi (0.5/km2). The racial makeup of the township was 90.00% White, 7.00% Native American, and 3.00% from two or more races.

There were 36 households, out of which 27.8% had children under the age of 18 living with them, 50.0% were married couples living together, 8.3% had a female householder with no husband present, and 36.1% were non-families. 30.6% of all households were made up of individuals, and 22.2% had someone living alone who was 65 years of age or older. The average household size was 2.78 and the average family size was 3.48.

In the township the population was spread out, with 34.0% under the age of 18, 2.0% from 18 to 24, 26.0% from 25 to 44, 25.0% from 45 to 64, and 13.0% who were 65 years of age or older. The median age was 37 years. For every 100 females, there were 122.2 males. For every 100 females age 18 and over, there were 106.3 males.

The median income for a household in the township was $19,500, and the median income for a family was $31,000. Males had a median income of $35,625 versus $25,417 for females. The per capita income for the township was $13,025. There were 26.9% of families and 33.3% of the population living below the poverty line, including 52.4% of under eighteens and 42.9% of those over 64.

References
 United States National Atlas
 United States Census Bureau 2007 TIGER/Line Shapefiles
 United States Board on Geographic Names (GNIS)

Townships in Cass County, Minnesota
Brainerd, Minnesota micropolitan area
Townships in Minnesota